Mullally or Mulally or Mullaly or Mulaly is a surname of Irish origin (Ó Maolalaidh)thought to have originated from County Galway where it has since been shortened to the form of Lally.

The surname is most numerous in the south east of Ireland in the counties of Tipperary and Kilkenny.

Notable people with the surname include:

 Alan Mulally (born 1945), American business executive, president of Ford Motor Company
 Alan Mullally (born 1969), English cricketer
 Anthony Mullally (born 1991), Irish rugby player
 Dick Mullaly (1892–1971), Australian rules footballer
 Erin Mullally (born 1990), Australian actor and model
 Evelyn Mullally, British academic
 Frederic Mullally (1918–2014), British journalist, public relations executive and novelist
 John Mullaly (1835–1915), American newspaper reporter and editor, "father of the Bronx's park system"
 John Mullally (born 1930), Canadian teacher and politician
 John E. Mullally, (1875–1912) member of the California State Assembly, 30th District, 1910–1912
 Megan Mullally (born 1958), American actress, talk show host and singer
 Mike Mullally (1939–2021), American college athletics administrator
 Paddy Mullally (born 1976), Irish hurler
 Richie Mullally (born 1978), Irish hurler
 Dame Sarah Mullally (born 1962), British former nurse, now a Church of England bishop
 Seán Ó Maolalaidh (fl. 1419–1480), Chief of the Name
 Una Mullally (born 1982/3), Irish broadcaster and journalist
 William Ó Mullally (c. 1530 – 1595), Archbishop of Tuam in the Church of Ireland

See also
 Mullally Township, Harlan County, Nebraska
 Lally, Irish surname which refers to the clan name Ó Maolalaidh

Surnames of Irish origin
Anglicised Irish-language surnames